The vice-president of Zambia is the second highest position in the executive branch of the Republic of Zambia. The vice-president was previously appointed by the president before the amendment of the Constitution in 2016. Under the amended Constitution, when the president dies, resigns or is removed from office, the vice-president automatically assumes the presidency, unlike when the Constitution demanded holding of presidential by-election within 90 days. This is so because now every presidential candidate shall pick a vice-presidential running mate and the two will share the vote meaning voting for a president is an automatic vote for the vice-president.

The vice-president also heads the Office of the Vice-President, a government ministry, and is also automatically a member of the National Assembly.

List of vice-presidents of Zambia (1964–present)

Political parties

See also
List of current vice presidents

References

Zambia
Zambia
 
Vice Presidents
1964 establishments in Zambia
1991 establishments in Zambia